Edward Livingston Martin (March 29, 1837 – January 22, 1897) was an American lawyer and politician from Seaford, in Sussex County, Delaware. He was a member of the Democratic Party, who served as U. S. Representative from Delaware.

Early life and family
Martin was born in Seaford, Delaware and attended private schools, Newark Academy, Bolmar's Academy in West Chester, Pennsylvania and Delaware College in Newark, Delaware. He graduated from the University of Virginia at Charlottesville in 1859.

Professional and political career
Martin served as clerk of the Delaware Senate from 1863 to 1865. He was a delegate to the Democratic National Conventions in 1864, 1872, 1876, 1880, and 1884. He studied law at the University of Virginia in 1866, was admitted to the Delaware Bar the same year and practiced in Dover until 1867. He then returned to Seaford and engaged in agricultural and horticultural pursuits, and served as director of the Delaware Board of Agriculture, president of the Peninsula Horticultural Society, and lecturer of the Delaware State Grange.

He was a commissioner to settle the disputed boundary line between the states of Delaware and New Jersey between 1873 and 1875. He was elected as a Democrat to the 46th and 47th Congress, serving from March 4, 1879 to March 4, 1883. He was not a candidate for renomination in 1882 and resumed horticultural and agricultural pursuits. He was twice an unsuccessful candidate for election to the U.S. Senate.

Death and legacy
Martin died at Seaford and is buried there in the St. Luke's Episcopal Churchyard.

Almanac
Elections are held the first Tuesday after November 1. U.S. Representatives took office March 4 and have a two-year term.

References

External links
Biographical Directory of the United States Congress
Delaware's Members of Congress
Find a Grave
The Political Graveyard

Places with more information
Delaware Historical Society; website; 505 North Market Street, Wilmington, Delaware 19801; (302) 655-7161
University of Delaware; Library website; 181 South College Avenue, Newark, Delaware 19717; (302) 831-2965

1837 births
1897 deaths
University of Virginia alumni
19th-century American Episcopalians
People from Seaford, Delaware
Kansas City Southern Railway
Burials in Sussex County, Delaware
Democratic Party members of the United States House of Representatives from Delaware
19th-century American politicians